Yana Dmitriyevna Sizikova (born 12 November 1994) is a Russian tennis player.

She has a career-high ranking of No. 336 in singles, achieved on 20 June 2016, and on 30 January 2023, she peaked at No. 44 in the doubles rankings of the WTA.

Sizikova made her WTA Tour main-draw debut at the 2018 St. Petersburg Trophy in the doubles tournament, partnering Dayana Yastremska.

In June 2021, she was arrested at Roland Garros after her French Open doubles first-round loss, amid a match fixing in tennis investigation from previous year's tournament. The prosecutor's office said her arrest was for "sports bribery and organized fraud for acts likely to have been committed in September 2020."  The case was opened by a French police unit specializing in betting fraud and match-fixing, and centered on suspicions about one match at Roland Garros. She has not been officially cleared and the matter remains unresolved.

WTA career finals

Doubles: 4 (2 titles, 2 runner-ups)

WTA Challenger finals

Doubles: 2 (1 title, 1 runner-up)

ITF Circuit finals

Singles: 15 (3 titles, 12 runner–ups)

Doubles: 76 (44 titles, 32 runner–ups)

Year-end rankings

Awards
 The Russian Cup in the nomination Student Tennis Players of the Year

See also
Youssef Hossam, tennis player accused of match fixing

References

External links
 
 

1994 births
Living people
Russian female tennis players
Tennis players from Moscow
Universiade medalists in tennis
Universiade gold medalists for Russia
Universiade bronze medalists for Russia
Medalists at the 2019 Summer Universiade
Tennis
Tennis controversies